Spring back may refer to:

 Spring Back Compensation, a method to compensate the spring back effect of metal while bending
 Bending, a forming process
 Bending (metalworking), a forming process, article specialized for metalworking